Hadlow Road railway station is a Grade II listed heritage railway station and museum in Willaston, on the Wirral Way footpath. It has been restored to have the look and feel of the day the station was permanently closed to passengers in 1956. It has an authentic ticket office, waiting room and telephone box. Formerly the museum was a working railway station on the single track Hooton to West Kirby branch of the Birkenhead Railway, on the Wirral Peninsula, Cheshire. The station is owned by Cheshire West and Chester Council, and Friends of Hadlow Road Station (FHRS) help to maintain and develop the station as a community resource.

History
The Birkenhead Railway, owned jointly by the Great Western Railway (GWR) and London and North Western Railway (LNWR), opened a single-track branch line from Hooton to Parkgate on 1 October 1866, which included a station at Willaston with a train passing place. An extension to West Kirby was completed twenty years later.

It was named Hadlow Road Station because there are 2 villages named Willaston in Cheshire and the name Willaston railway station had already been taken by the time of Hadlow Road's opening.

The main station building is on the eastbound platform towards , whereas a smaller waiting shelter stands on the westbound platform towards . At the western end of both platforms was a level crossing with rather large gates; this was due to the angle at which the road crossed the railway lines.

Hadlow Road railway station closed to passengers on 17 September 1956. The track continued to be used for freight transportation and driver training for another six years, closing on 7 May 1962. The tracks were lifted two years later.

Wirral Country Park

The station is on the Wirral Way footpath and part of Wirral Country Park. The country park lies both in the Metropolitan Borough of Wirral and in the borough of Cheshire West and Chester, it was the first designated country park in Britain opening in 1973. The footpath follows the track bed of part of the former Birkenhead Railway route from West Kirby to Hooton and is used by cyclists, walkers, joggers and horse riders. A second visitor centre is present on the Wirral Way at Thurstaston; however, Thurstaston railway station was removed and all that remains are its platforms.

Museum
The station is now a small free museum that is open to the public. It was created to have the look and feel of the day it closed, with a ticket office, telephone box, vintage signs and luggage carriers. All of the station (excluding the westbound platform) has been preserved and a short section of track has been relaid by FHRS in front of the eastbound platform. The signal box and crossing gates are not the originals, having previously been located at Hassall Green on the North Staffordshire Railway. The station is recorded in the National Heritage List for England as a designated Grade II listed building. The facilities available are car parking, seating and public toilets.

Friends of Hadlow Railway Station
The station is owned by the council, but Friends of Hadlow Road Station, a community organisation, has helped to restore and maintain the site. FHRS has installed a model railway of the station as it was in the 1950s in the signal box, viewable from the signal box platform. There have been various plans to restore and upgrade the facilities and as of 2018 FHRS have expressed interest in placing carriages at the station from which themed meals could be served.

Gallery

See also

Listed buildings in Willaston, Cheshire West
List of museums in Cheshire

References

Further reading

External links

Railway stations in Great Britain opened in 1866
Railway stations in Great Britain closed in 1956
Grade II listed railway stations
Grade II listed buildings in Cheshire
Disused railway stations in Cheshire
Former Birkenhead Railway stations
1866 establishments in England
Willaston, Cheshire West and Chester